Derveni is a location between Efkarpia and Lagyna, approximately ten kilometers north-east of Thessaloniki. At Derveni an archeological site is located where a necropolis was discovered, part of a cemetery of the ancient city of Lete. Valuable artifacts were uncovered at this site, including the Derveni papyrus and Derveni krater.

Notes

Ancient Mygdonia
Ancient cemeteries in Greece